David "Chase" Baird (born March 18, 1988) is an American saxophonist and composer.

Biography

Early life
Baird was born in Seattle, Washington. He was introduced to music at an early age by his father, a trumpet player who played in rock bands and doubled on an eclectic collection of instruments, including saxophone, flute, Rhodes, synthesizer and percussion. His family moved to Salt Lake City, Utah, in 1996. He began to play the saxophone around age ten, eventually studied jazz and improvisation for several years with saxophonist Alan Braufman.

During his teenage years, Baird became highly influenced by the music of saxophonist Michael Brecker. A chance encounter with drummer Jeff Hamilton inspired Baird to try to connect with Brecker directly for music lessons. After making contact via Brecker's manager, Brecker agreed to meet in person next time he traveled through Salt Lake City in early 2003.  Although brief, Baird cites Brecker's mentorship around this time as influential on the trajectory of his career.

In 2004, Baird's family relocated to the San Francisco Bay Area. He began to collaborate with other young musicians, including pianist Julian Waterfall Pollack. He graduated from Acalanes High School in Lafayette, California in 2006.

2006–present
Baird attended Diablo Valley College for one year, where he studied psychology. He later transferred to California State University, Long Beach to study music, notably with saxophonists Eric Marienthal, Sal Lozano and Jay Mason and program director Jeff Jarvis. He left the program after two years and eventually relocated to New York City, where he enrolled at The Juilliard School (studying with Ron Blake, Steve Wilson, Joe Temperley, Frank Kimbrough, Rodney Jones, Kendall Briggs and others) and completed an undergraduate degree in 2014.

In 2009, he was featured in the soundtrack to Emancipated, a film by P.K. Ziainia with music by composer Rodrigo Denis.

Baird recorded and released his debut album, Crosscurrent, in 2010, featuring pianist Julian Waterfall Pollack, guitarist John Storie, bassist Christopher Tordini, drummer Steve Lyman and percussionist James Yoshizawa.

Baird joined drummer Antonio Sánchez's group Migration in 2018, recording both saxophone and Electronic Wind Instrument on the group's critically acclaimed album Lines in the Sand. He also began to co-lead the band Venture, alongside drummer Mike Clark, vibraphonist Mark Sherman and electric bassist Felix Pastorius. The group released their first album Life Cycle on Ropeadope Records.

Baird released A Life Between, his second album as a leader in August 2019. The recording features Brad Mehldau, Antonio Sánchez, Nir Felder and Dan Chmielinski. He collaborated with drummer Steve Lyman to compose, record and produce the electro-acoustic composition Pulsar, later released in July 2020.

He has also worked alongside jazz and fusion artists including Mike Stern, Antonio Farao, Aaron Parks, Thana Alexa, Dennis Chambers, Gary Grainger, Gene Perla, Dan Tepfer, Jeremy Green, Victor Wooten, Keith Carlock, Circuit Kisser and the Mingus Big Band, among others. His work as a featured soloist with the Kyle Athayde Dance Party has garnered over one million views on YouTube. In the pop and rock genres, he performed with Chaka Khan, Matthew Morrison, Jakob Dylan, Diana Degarmo, Chloe Agnew and Morgan James.

Selected discography

As leader
Pulsar (Outside In Music, 2020) with Steve Lyman, J3PO (Julian Pollack) & Dan Chmielinski
A Life Between (Soundsabound Records, 2019) with Brad Mehldau, Nir Felder, Dan Chmielinski and Antonio Sanchez
Crosscurrent (Junebeat Records, 2010) with Julian Pollack, John Storie, Chris Tordini, Steve Lyman and James Yoshizawa

As co-leader
Life Cycle (Ropeadope Records, 2018) with Mark Sherman, Felix Pastorius and Mike Clark

As sideman
Michael & Me – Jeremy Green feat. Victor Wooten, Keith Carlock and Chase Baird (Independent, 2020)
Force Tranquille – Jean-marie Corrois (Independent, 2020)
Faking The Moon Landing – Circuit Kisser (Soundsabound Records, 2019)
Lines in the Sand – Antonio Sanchez & Migration (CAM Jazz, 2018)
Language of Sound and Spirit – Joshua Maxey (Independent, 2012)
Hunter –  Morgan James (Epic, 2014)
Celebration of Soul –  Joshua Maxey (Independent, 2015)

References

External links 

1988 births
Living people
Post-bop saxophonists
American jazz saxophonists
American male saxophonists
American jazz composers
American male jazz composers
Juilliard School alumni
21st-century American saxophonists
21st-century American male musicians
Caleb Chapman's Crescent Super Band members